Ononis natrix, the yellow restharrow or shrubby rest-harrow, is a species of plant in the family Fabaceae.

Description
Perennial, 50–100 cm, ligneous at base, completely viscousglandular. Leaves with three oblong and denticulate leaflets. Flowers in terminal leafy racemes. Peduncles long, one-flowered, often aristate. Calyx lobes much longer than tube. Corolla 15 mm, twice as long as calyx, yellow. Standard with red brown striations.

Flowering
April–July.

Habitat
Sandy and stony places on limestone.

Distribution
Coast, lower and middle mountains, Beqaa, South, Antilebanon.

Geographic area
Syria, Lebanon, Palestine, Jordan, Egypt, Libya, Tunisia,
Algeria, Morocco, Circum-Mediterranean.

Onônis or anônis is the Greek name of a Mediterranean species of the genus. It is sometimes interpreted as formed of onos, donkey. and onesis. happiness. for certain rest-harrows were thought to please to donkeys. Nalrix is the name of a water snake, given to a plant whose pollen tube discharges ciliated antherozoids which swim ( just like a water snake) before entering the embryo sac.

The branches of this plant. known in Arabic by the name lissayq, are used in the preparation of raisin.

References

Georges Tohme& Henriette Tohme, IIIustrated Flora of Lebanon, National Council For Scientific Research, Second Edition 2014.

Flora of Tunisia
Flora of Algeria
Flora of Lebanon and Syria
natrix
Taxa named by Carl Linnaeus